Nicholas Cheong Jin-suk (7 December 1931 – 27 April 2021) was a South Korean Cardinal of the Roman Catholic Church. He served as Archbishop of Seoul from 1998 until he retired in 2012. He was previously Bishop of Cheongju from 1970 to 1998. He was made a cardinal in 2006.

Biography
Cheong Jin-suk briefly studied chemical engineering at the Seoul National University before entering the seminary in Seoul, from where he later obtained his bachelor's degree in theology, in 1954. After studying sociology in Hong Kong, he was ordained to the priesthood by Archbishop Paul Roh Ki-nam on 18 March 1961 at the Myeongdong Cathedral in Seoul.

Cheong then did pastoral work in Seoul until becoming a professor at its minor seminary and notary of its archdiocesan curia in 1962. He was chancellor of the curia and undersecretary of the Catholic Conference from 1964 to 1965, and episcopal chancellor and vice-rector of the Minor Seminary from 1966 to 1967. He then earned a degree in canon law, studying at the Pontifical Urban University, from October 1968 to 1970.

On 25 June 1970, Cheong was appointed the second Bishop of Cheongju by Pope Paul VI. He was the youngest bishop in Korea at the time. He received his episcopal consecration on the following 3 October from Archbishop Kinam Ro, with Bishops James Pardy, MM, and Peter Han Kong-ryel serving as co-consecrators, in the Church of the Holy Family in Cheongju. He was elected to a three-year term as president of the Korean Episcopal Conference in 1996.

Cheong was appointed the third Archbishop of Seoul on 3 April 1998. In addition to his duties in Seoul, he was made Apostolic Administrator of P'yong-yang on 6 June of that same year.

Pope Benedict XVI created him Cardinal-Priest of Santa Maria Immacolata di Lourdes a Boccea in the consistory of 24 March 2006. Cheong was appointed to the executive committee of the Pontifical Council for the Family on the following 6 May, and to the Council of Cardinals for the Study of the Organizational and Economic Problems of the Holy See on 3 February 2007. He was later appointed a member of the Pontifical Council for Social Communications.

On his 80th birthday, 7 December 2011, Cheong lost his curial memberships. His resignation as archbishop was accepted by Pope Benedict XVI on 10 May 2012 and he was succeeded by Andrew Yeom Soo-jung.

Cheong died at Saint Mary's Hospital in Seoul at the age of 89 on 27 April 2021. He had celebrated sixty years of his priesthood the previous month. He had been admitted to hospital on 21 February with critical health issues such as breathing difficulties and a slight fever and his successor Cardinal Yeom Soo-jung administered the Anointing of the Sick on 22 February. By the first week of March, Cheong's condition seemed to improve upon the removal of life-sustaining equipment, barring the intravenous, with reports that his blood pressure and oxygen levels were gradually returning to normal. He was adamant that he would not have any surgery, nor would he remain connected to any equipment that would prolong his life. He also signed up for organ donation in the event of his death.

References

External links
 
Cardinals of the Holy Roman Church

1931 births
2021 deaths
Pontifical Urban University alumni
20th-century Roman Catholic archbishops in South Korea
21st-century Roman Catholic archbishops in South Korea
Roman Catholic archbishops of Seoul
Clergy from Seoul
South Korean cardinals
South Korean Roman Catholic archbishops
Pontifical Council for the Family
Cardinals created by Pope Benedict XVI
Roman Catholic bishops of Pyongyang
Roman Catholic bishops of Cheongju